Lestes congener is a species of damselfly in the family Lestidae, the spreadwings. It is known by the common name spotted spreadwing.

Description
In the western part of their range, these dragonflies are somewhat larger than in the eastern part.

The thorax is slaty gray dorsally, with two dark elongated spots (hence the common name) on the latero-ventral surface. The eyes are blue in males, while in the females they are always brown. The abdomen is greyish to blackish with bronze reflections, the last two segments of the abdomen are pale gray. The wings are clear and transparent. Like other damselflies of the family Lestidae they hold their wings at about 45 degrees to the body when resting. The larvae are light brown and up to 25 millimeters long. The time of flight of the adults ranges from late July to mid-September.

Distribution
This species is widespread throughout North America, in Canada and in the United States except in the southeastern states.

Habitat
This damselfly lives on the banks of permanent and temporary water-filled ponds, on flooded river banks and on slow-moving water, on marshes and on swamps.

References

External links
 Lestes congener – Spotted Spreadwing. Bug Guide.
 Lestes congener images. CalPhotos. UC Berkeley.
 Spotted Spreadwing: Lestes congener. NJOdes: The Dragonflies and Damselflies of New Jersey.

Further reading
Milne, L. and M. Milne. Field Guide to Insects and Spiders. National Audubon Society, Chantacleer Press, 1980. p 384

C
Odonata of North America
Insects of Canada
Insects of the United States
Fauna of the Eastern United States
Fauna of the Western United States
Least concern biota of North America
Least concern biota of the United States
Insects described in 1861
Taxa named by Hermann August Hagen